Michael Dowling may refer to:

Michael Dowling, author who writes under the pseudonym Tobias Druitt
 Michael Dowling (footballer) (1889–?), English footballer
 Michael J. Dowling, president and chief executive officer of Northwell Health
 Michael J. Dowling (politician) (1866–1921), Minnesota politician
 Michael Dowling (scholar), American scholar
 Mick Dowling (born 1946), Irish former Olympic boxer